Mick "Cloney" Brennan (born 1950) is a retired Irish sportsman.  He played hurling with Erin's Own and Gaelic Football with his local club Railyard and was a member of the Kilkenny senior inter-county team in the 1970s and 1980s. He was named an All Star in 1975, 1976, and 1979.

References 

Living people
Railyard hurlers
Kilkenny inter-county hurlers
Leinster inter-provincial hurlers
All-Ireland Senior Hurling Championship winners
1950 births